Hibbertia haplostemona is a species of flowering plant in the family Dilleniaceae and is endemic to the Northern Territory. It is a small, short-lived sub-shrub with wiry, prostrate or low-lying stems, elliptic to egg-shaped leaves that are soon lost, and small red flowers with five stamens .

Description
The five sepals are oblong to elliptic and about the same size and shape as each other. There are five stamens arranged around the carpels.

Taxonomy
This species was first formally described in 1992 by Lyndley Craven and Clyde Robert Dunlop and given the name Pachynema diffusum in Australian Systematic Botany. After genetic studies of plastid DNA, James W. Horn changed the name to Hibbertia haplostemona. The name was chosen because Hibbertia diffusa had already been used for a different species.

Distribution and habitat
This hibbertia grows on sandstone, often with Triodia species in the northern part of the Northern Territory.

Conservation status
Hibbertia haplostemona is classified as of "least concern" under the Territory Parks and Wildlife Conservation Act 1976 and is conserved in Kakadu, Litchfield and Nitmiluk National Parks.

See also
List of Hibbertia species

References

haplostemona
Flora of the Northern Territory
Plants described in 1992
Taxa named by Lyndley Craven